Juliana '31 is a football club from Malden, Netherlands.

Juliana was promoted to Topklasse in 2012–13 after winning the promotion/relegation play-offs. It returned to the Hoofdklasse through relegation after only one season. In 2015–16 it returned to the renamed Derde Divisie by winning Hoofdklasse C. In 2017–18 it played in the Sunday Hoofdklasse B, relegated the next season to Eerste Klasse, to return a season later to the Hoofdklasse.

References

External links
 Official site

Football clubs in the Netherlands
1931 establishments in the Netherlands
Association football clubs established in 1931
Football clubs in Gelderland
Heumen